Geoffrey L. Cohen is the James G. March Professor of Organizational Studies in Education and Business, professor of psychology and, by courtesy, at the Graduate School of Business at Stanford University. He is also a faculty affiliate of the Stanford Institute for Human-Centered Artificial Intelligence. His research focuses on how brief interventions can create long-lasting psychological and behavioral change. His focus has been on the psychology of self and belonging. He and his colleagues have shown how brief values-affirmations can benefit school performance, close political divides, and open people up to threatening information.

Education 
Cohen graduated with a B.A. in psychology from Cornell University in 1992. He earned a Ph.D. in psychology from Stanford University in 1998.

Career and research 
Before joining Stanford University, Cohen held academic appointments at the Yale University and the University of Colorado at Boulder.

Cohen's work is based in the belief that one way to understand psychological processes is to try to change them. At Stanford, he runs the Cohen Lab, which investigates how, when, and why people change through laboratory and randomized experiments, longitudinal studies, and content analyses, with a focus on racial and gender achievement gaps. His research has examined political ideologies, adolescents’ misperceptions of their peers, how different cultures view "passion" in relation to achievement, and how to reduce school discipline rates for Black and Latino boys through interventions that reduce worries about belonging.

In a 2007 paper, Cohen and co-author Greg Walton coined the term "belonging uncertainty" to describe the experience of members of marginalized groups in academic and professional settings and showed through experimental research that Black students’ academic achievement increased with an intervention designed to dispel their doubts about social belonging.

Awards and Professional Memberships 

 Cialdini Prize, 2015, Society for Personality and Social Psychology.
Social Psychology Network
 Society for Personality and Social Psychology
 Society for the Psychological Study of Social Issues

Works 

 Belonging: The Science of Creating Connection and Bridging Divides, W. W. Norton & Company, 2022.

References 

Year of birth missing (living people)
Living people
Place of birth missing (living people)
Cornell University alumni
Stanford University alumni
Yale University faculty
University of Colorado Boulder faculty
Stanford University Graduate School of Business faculty